Marijuana is a 34-minute 1968 anti-drug documentary film by Max Miller and distributed by Avanti Films. It is narrated by Sonny Bono. It was described as "the first major film effort to center upon the use and possible risks of marijuana", in which "arguments for and against its use are presented and the accumulation of arguments against is allowed to speak for itself". Music for the documentary was composed by The Byrds' Gene Clark, a "bizarre" choice in his musical career, resulting in "meandering blues and pseudo-psychedelic instrumental jams".

See also

Case Study: LSD, a 1969 film also narrated by Sonny Bono

References

External links
Marijuana at Internet Archive (full film, public domain)

1968 films
American documentary films about cannabis
American independent films
American social guidance and drug education films
Anti-cannabis media
1960s English-language films
1960s American films